Nebulous is a post-apocalyptic science fiction comedy radio show.

Nebulous may also refer to:

 A reference to a nebula
 Nebulous wrasse, (Halichoeres nebulosus), a species of fish
  Nebulous moray, or snowflake moray, (Echidna nebulosa), a species of eel

See also
 Nebulus (disambiguation)
 Nebula (disambiguation)